Saulius Klevinskas (born 2 April 1984) is a retired Lithuanian professional footballer who played as a goalkeeper.

Career
Klevinskas returned for a second spell in Žalgiris in January 2015, but could not beat Armantas Vitkauskas for the main spot and took role of the second choice keeper. Goalkeeper left the club on 8 July 2017. He managed a total of 57 appearances in all competitions throughout 2,5 years in the club, winning 2 league titles, 3 domestic cup and supercup victories.

References

External links
 

1984 births
Living people
Lithuanian footballers
Lithuania international footballers
Association football goalkeepers
Lithuanian expatriate footballers
A Lyga players
FK Sūduva Marijampolė players
FK Žalgiris players
Expatriate footballers in Armenia
Lithuanian expatriate sportspeople in Armenia
FC Mika players
Armenian Premier League players
Expatriate footballers in Russia
Lithuanian expatriate sportspeople in Russia
FC Torpedo Moscow players